Jan Schenkman  (born 1 October 1806 in Amsterdam, Netherlands - died 4 May 1863 in Amsterdam, Netherlands) was a Dutch teacher, poet, and author of books for children. He is best remembered for writing several traditional songs sung during the Sinterklaas holidays.

References

19th-century Dutch poets
19th-century Dutch male writers
Dutch children's writers
Sinterklaas
1806 births
1863 deaths
Dutch male poets